Emperor Cảnh Thịnh, born Nguyễn Quang Toản (1783–1802), was the third and last emperor of the Tây Sơn dynasty. He followed his father Quang Trung (Nguyễn Huệ ruled 1788–1792) at the age of 9, and reigned for 10 years.

Cảnh Thịnh was defeated by the Nguyễn dynasty in 1802. He was taken, along with a number of his royalties, officials and generals, to Phú Xuân. There, he was executed by Gia Long, first emperor of the Nguyễn dynasty.

Biography
Nguyễn Quang Toản was the eldest son of Nguyễn Huệ (Emperor Quang Trung). According to Đại Nam chính biên liệt truyện, he was born to the Empress Consort Phạm Thị Liên. After Nguyễn Huệ crowned the emperor, Nguyễn Quang Toản was designated as Crown Prince. In 1790, Toản received the title An Nam quốc vương thế tử ("Crown Prince of Annam") from China. The title indicated that his heirship was also recognized by China.

Quang Trung died in 1792. On the deathbed, Quang Trung described Nguyễn Quang Toản as "a clever boy but too young". Toản ascended the throne and changed the era name to "Cảnh Thịnh" in the same year, when he was only nine years old. He granted his stepmother Bùi Thị Nhạn the title Empress dowager. Bùi Đắc Tuyên was granted the position thái sư ("Grand Preceptor"). Bùi Đắc Tuyên was favoured by the young emperor, and became the de facto ruler of the country. Tuyên banished one of important ministers, Trần Văn Kỷ, from the capital Phú Xuân (mordern Huế). His behavior had aroused the anger of many ministers and generals.

In 1793, Nguyễn Nhạc was attacked by Nguyễn lord, asked for Nguyễn Quang Toản's help. Toản repulsed the attack, then annexed Nhạc's territory. Nhạc died soon after suffering from vomiting blood. Nhạc's eldest son, Nguyễn Văn Bảo, was granted the title Hiếu công by Toản. Bùi Đắc Trụ and Nguyễn Văn Huấn were left in Quy Nhơn to watch Bảo.

Tây Sơn launched a powerful offensive in 1794. Two Tây Sơn generals, Trần Viết Kết and Nguyễn Văn Huấn, laid siege to Diên Khánh. in 1794, but Nguyễn lord's forces were able to keep them out. Several months later, Trần Quang Diệu and Nguyễn Văn Tứ were sent to attack Diên Khánh again. However, a coup d'état occurred in the next year, forcing Diệu to withdraw. One night, Nguyễn Quang Toản was in Bùi Đắc Tuyên's house. Vũ Văn Dũng, Phạm Công Hưng and Nguyễn Văn Huấn, besieged house, forcing Cảnh Thịnh to hand over Tuyên. Later, Tuyên was executed together with Bùi Đắc Trụ and his right hand Ngô Văn Sở. Toản could do nothing but weep. As a niece-in-law of Tuyên, general Trần Quang Diệu was not trusted by the three generals. Diệu quickly marched north and stayed at An Cựu. In the same time, an army under Vũ Văn Dũng and Nguyễn Văn Danh also marched there. A civil war might break out at any moment, which made the young emperor afraid. Finally, Diệu was reconciled with the three generals.

Nguyễn Quang Toản started to rule the country directly; he appointed Trần Quang Diệu, Vũ Văn Dũng, Nguyễn Văn Huấn, Nguyễn Văn Danh (or Nguyễn Văn Tứ) as his assistants. This arrangement proved to be unsatisfactory. Not long after, Diệu was removed from military leadership. Diệu was fearful and anxious, from then on, he refused to attend the imperial court.

The power struggle destabilized the regime, which provided Nguyễn lord an opportunity to launch an offensive attack in 1797. What was worse, Nguyễn Văn Bảo occupied Quy Nhơn and planned to surrender to Nguyễn lord. Fortunately, the rebellion was put down in 1798. However, many ministers were accused of getting involved in the incident, including Lê Trung and Nguyễn Văn Huấn. They were arrested and executed. Tây Sơn generals felt themselves imperilled, they were at odds with the emperor.

In 1799, Quy Nhơn was besieged by Nguyễn Ánh. Trần Quang Diệu and Vũ Văn Dũng was sent to reinforce, but was ambushed by Nguyễn army in Thạch Tân. Hearing the news of defeat, governor Lê Văn Thanh surrendered to Nguyễn Ánh. Quy Nhơn was captured by Nguyễn lord, its name was changed to Bình Định. Trần Viết Kết and Hồ Công Diệu, spoke evil of Trần Quang Diệu. Nguyễn Quang Toản ordered Dũng to kill Diệu. But, Dũng showed the letter to Trần Quang Diệu. Trần Quang Diệu marched to Phú Xuân. Hồ Công Diệu was chosen as scapegoat; he was arrested and transferred to Trần Quang Diệu.

In 1800, Trần Quang Diệu and Vũ Văn Dũng were sent south to besiege Quy Nhơn. Nguyễn Ánh led a large number of army to reinforce Bình Định. However, Võ Tánh, the governor of Bình Định, suggested that he would pin the main Tây Sơn force down there so that Nguyễn Ánh could attack their capital Phú Xuân. Ánh agreed, and then he marched north.

In this time, Nguyễn Quang Toản had to deal with several internal rebellions. Hà Công Thái, a Degar leader, revolted in Thanh Hóa Province and pledged loyalty to Nguyễn lord; a Christian-inspired revolt broke out in Tonkin. To make matters worse, Vientiane and Muang Phuan attacked Nghệ An Province, cooperating with Nguyễn forces.

Nguyễn Quang Toản had to ask Nguyễn Thiếp for advice. Thiếp said it was impossible to deal with current affairs; however, if the capital could be relocated in Phượng Hoàng trung đô (in present-day Vinh), the lifetime of the dynasty might be prolonged. Toản vacillated for too long and the opportunity to accept was lost. In 1801, Nguyễn Ánh's army reached Tư Dung estuary (present-day Tư Hiền estuary), defeated Nguyễn Văn Trị in Quy Sơn Hill. A naval battle broke out in Nộn estuary (present-day Thuận An estuary); both Nguyễn Quang Toản and Nguyễn Ánh directed the battle personally. Many Chinese pirates were hired by Tây Sơn to fight against Nguyễn lord. In Nguyễn lord side, several Western adventurers joined the battle, including Jean-Baptiste Chaigneau, Philippe Vannier and Laurent André Barisy. Chaigneau described that it was the fiercest battle between Tây Sơn dynasty and Nguyễn lord. The battle ended with a near annihilation of both Tây Sơn navy and Chinese pirates. Three famous pirates, Mo Guanfu, Liang Wengeng (Lương Văn Canh) and Fan Wencai ( Phàn Văn Tài), were captured by Nguyễn lord.

Nguyễn army soon occupied the capital Phú Xuân. Nguyễn Quang Toản fled to Đồng Hới, with a dozen men, then to Thăng Long. In there, he was supported by his brother Nguyễn Quang Thùy. Nguyễn Quang Toản changed the era name to "Bảo Hưng". He made efforts to gain popularity among Northern Vietnamese. In foreign affairs, he sent an envoy to seek aid from the Jiaqing Emperor of Qing China. Meanwhile, Nguyễn Ánh also sent an envoy, extraditing Mo Guanfu, Liang Wengeng and Fan Wencai to China. Three pirates confessed that they were supported by Tây Sơn dynasty. It proved that Tây Sơn dynasty had shielded many Chinese pirates. Before this incident, Chinese government had captured two pirates Wang Guili (Vương Quý Lợi) and Fan Guangxi (Phạm Quang Hỉ); in their vessels, Chinese found two Tây Sơn official seals. The irate Jiaqing rejected to help Nguyễn Quang Toản, and deported his envoy.

In 1802, Nguyễn Quang Thùy was sent to attack Lũy Thầy (in present-day Quảng Bình Province). Later, Nguyễn Quang Toản led 30 thousand men marched to Linh River (modern Gianh River) to attack Nguyễn Ánh. Both of their army were utterly beaten. Toản fled to Nghệ An, in there he met Nguyễn Quang Thùy. They fled back to Thăng Long together.

Nguyễn Ánh's army marched further north. In June, they captured Thăng Long. Nguyễn Quang Toản fled across the Nhị River (present day Red River) along with Nguyễn Quang Thùy, Nguyễn Quang Thùy, Nguyễn Quang Thiệu, Nguyễn Văn Dụng, Nguyễn Văn Tứ and the Empress dowager Bùi Thị Nhạn. In Phượng Nhãn (Lạng Giang), They were captured alive by local villagers. Nguyễn Quang Thùy and Bùi Thị Nhạn committed suicide; the others were transferred to Phú Xuân, and executed by Nguyễn Ánh. According to Đại Nam thực lục, Nguyễn Quang Toản and his three brothers, Nguyễn Quang Duy, Nguyễn Quang Thiệu and Nguyễn Quang Bàn, were executed by slow slicing, then their bodies were dismembered by having five elephants pull the limbs and head.

References

Sources 

 .

Tây Sơn dynasty emperors
1783 births
1802 deaths
Child monarchs from Asia
18th-century Vietnamese monarchs
19th-century Vietnamese monarchs
People executed by Vietnam
Executed Vietnamese people
Vietnamese monarchs